Cliff Schwarz is an American composer. His work includes a news theme used by Pennsylvania television station WNEP-TV since 1994, based on Al Ham's Move Closer to Your World.

Other work includes: Shadow Kill (2004), Making 'Carnivàle': The Show Behind the Show (2003) (TV), "The Invisible Man" (2000) TV Series (theme)... aka I-Man (USA: second season title), "Crossing Over with John Edward" (1999) TV Series

External links

Cliff Schwarz at SouthernMedia's NMSA - list of American stations that have used the news theme produced by Cliff Schwarz
 Cliff Schwarz's "That's TV Magic" website

American television composers
Living people
Year of birth missing (living people)